The 1992 Virginia Slims Championships were held in New York City, United States between November 16 and November 22.

Finals

Singles

 Monica Seles defeated  Martina Navratilova, 7–5, 6–3, 6–1.

Doubles

 Arantxa Sánchez Vicario /  Helena Suková defeated  Jana Novotná /  Larisa Savchenko Neiland, 7–6(7–4), 6–1.

References

External links
 
 WTA tournament edition details

WTA Tour Championships
WTA Tour Championships
WTA Tour Championships
WTA Tour Championships
1990s in Manhattan
WTA Tour Championships
Madison Square Garden
Sports competitions in New York City
Sports in Manhattan
Tennis tournaments in New York City